Óscar Alvarado was a Chilean sprinter. He competed in the men's 100 metres at the 1928 Summer Olympics.

References

External links
 

Year of birth missing
Year of death missing
Athletes (track and field) at the 1928 Summer Olympics
Chilean male sprinters
Chilean male long jumpers
Olympic athletes of Chile
Place of birth missing